Solanum chippendalei  (common names - solanum, bush tomato, ngaru, Chippendale's tomato) is a small fruiting shrub in the family Solanaceae, native to northern Australia. It is named after its discoverer, George Chippendale. The fruits, known as "bush tomatoes", are edible and are an important indigenous food, and the aborigines who use them broadcast the seed for later harvesting.

The species occurs in Western Australia, the Northern Territory and Queensland.

Distribution 
In Queensland it is found in the IBRA region of Mount Isa Inlier.

In the Northern Territory it is found in the IBRA regions of: Burt Plain, Central Ranges, Davenport Murchison Ranges, Gibson Desert, Great Sandy Desert, MacDonnell Ranges, Ord Victoria Plain, and Tanami.

In Western Australia it is found in the IBRA regions of:Central Ranges, Gascoyne, Gibson Desert, Great Sandy Desert, Little Sandy Desert,  Pilbara, and Tanami.

Habitat 

Names 
The many Indigenous names reflect  both its importance in the Central desert and the many language groups. They are: 

 Alyawarr: anaweyt, anemangkerr, kanakety
 Anmatyerr: anakety, antyewal
 Eastern Arrernte: *anaketye
 Jaru: rambaramba. 
 Kaytetye: antyewarle, kanaketye, karnaketye, kwenemangkerre 
 Pintupi Luritja: ngaru, pintalypa, pura
 Pitjantjatjara: ngaru, pintalypa, pura, wirkalpa
 Waramangu: nganjawarli 
 Warlpiri: kakaja, ngaru, kurla-parnta, nganjawarli, ngayaki, wanakiji
 Western Arrernte: kwere

References

External links

 
 Solanum chippendalei occurrence data from the Australasian Virtual Herbarium

chippendalei
Solanales of Australia
Flora of the Northern Territory
Flora of Queensland
Eudicots of Western Australia
Plants described in 1981